Mary Akpobome born Mary Udoh Bassey, July 11, 1968 to Ben Bassey Udoh, and Janet Bassey Udoh, Efa, Akwa Ibom, Nigeria is a director of Heritage Banking Company Limited of Nigeria (HBCL).

Education

Mary attended Qua Iboe Mission Secondary School, Etinan, Akwa Ibom and proceeded to University of Benin where she studied Theatre Arts graduating in 1991, In 2001, she enrolled at the University of Lagos where she obtained her MBA. She is also an alumnus of the prestigious INSEAD and INSEAD Business School, Orchestrating Winning Performance (IMD), Lausanne, Switzerland and the Lagos Business School (LBS). She is member of the institute of Directors (IOD), a fellow of the institute of Credit Administration (ICA). She is also a fellow of the Chartered Institute of Bankers (CIBN).

Career

Mary is an executive director overseeing the Service and wealth Management group of Heritage Banking Company Limited (HBCL). Having started her banking career in 1991 and in her over 2 decade banking experience has worked in; Citizens International Bank (now Enterprise Bank Limited, Nigeria) and Bank PHB (now Keystone Bank). Before joining Heritage Banking Company Limited as a pioneer Executive Director (ED).

Personal life
In 2006, Mary married her longtime heartthrob, Alibaba Akporobome

References

External links
 Mary Akpobome

Living people
Nigerian women business executives
University of Lagos alumni
Nigerian accountants
1968 births
INSEAD alumni
Lagos Business School alumni
University of Benin (Nigeria) alumni
Nigerian corporate directors
Women corporate directors